Ronald Bonnetrouge is a Canadian politician, who was elected to the Legislative Assembly of the Northwest Territories in the 2019 election. He represents the electoral district of Deh Cho.

References 

Living people
Members of the Legislative Assembly of the Northwest Territories
21st-century Canadian politicians
Year of birth missing (living people)